

See also 
 Lists of fossiliferous stratigraphic units in Europe

References 
 

 Moldova
Geology of Moldova
Fossiliferous stratigraphic units